東京灣 may refer to:

Gulf of Tonkin, bordering Vietnam and China
Tokyo Bay, bordering Japan